Here Comes the Judge may refer to:

Here Comes the Judge (album), a 1964 jazz album by Eddie Harris
"Here Comes the Judge" (Shorty Long song), 1968
"Here Comes the Judge" (Pigmeat Markham song), 1968
"Here Come de Judge", a regular sketch on Rowan & Martin's Laugh-In, done in the first season by Pigmeat Markham and in subsequent seasons by Sammy Davis, Jr.

Comedy catchphrases
Quotations from television
1968 neologisms